Tellabs Inc. v. Makor Issues & Rights, 551 U.S. 308 (2007), was a United States Supreme Court case in which the Court ruled on the interpretation of the Private Securities Litigation Reform Act of 1995's requirement of scienter in a civil action in  apply to Tellabs and Makor Issues & Rights.  The various federal circuits have taken different approaches to defining what it means, under the PSLRA, for a plaintiff to sufficiently plead a "strong inference" of scienter (a mental state embracing intent to deceive, manipulate, or defraud).

The Court ruled a reasonable inference of scienter from assumed-true facts was insufficient and inconsistent with Congressional intent. Writing for the Court, Justice Ginsburg wrote that "to qualify as “strong” within the intendment of § 21D(b)(2), we hold, an inference of scienter must be more than merely plausible or reasonable - it must be cogent and at least as compelling as any opposing inference of nonfraudulent intent...the inference of scienter must be more than merely “reasonable” or “permissible”-it must be cogent and compelling, thus strong in light of other explanations. A complaint will survive, we hold, only if a reasonable person would deem the inference of scienter cogent and at least as compelling as any opposing inference one could draw from the facts alleged."

Tellabs increased the hurdle civil litigants must traverse in order to recover damages for securities fraud because it made it more difficult to demonstrate scienter (a necessary element of the claim).  Instead of being able to reasonably deduce scienter from the alleged facts of the case, a claimant must also demonstrate that fraud is at least as likely as other, more-innocent explanations.

See also
 List of United States Supreme Court cases, volume 551
List of United States Supreme Court cases

References

United States Supreme Court cases
United States securities case law
2007 in United States case law
United States Supreme Court cases of the Roberts Court